The Whittington Park Historic District encompasses a mainly residential area in northwestern Hot Springs, Arkansas.  The district is centered on Whittington Park, a landscaped design of Frederick Law Olmsted built in the 1890s by the National Park Service.  The park is lined to the north and south by a neighborhood built out in two phases, 1920–40 and 1950-1960s.  These building periods are represented by a significant number of modest Craftsman and Ranch-style houses, built primarily for people of modest means.  There are also several Queen Anne Victorians in the area, the most notable of which stands at 524 Whittington.

The district was listed on the National Register of Historic Places in 2012.

See also

National Register of Historic Places listings in Garland County, Arkansas

References

Hot Springs, Arkansas
Historic districts on the National Register of Historic Places in Arkansas
National Register of Historic Places in Hot Springs, Arkansas
Parks on the National Register of Historic Places in Arkansas
National Register of Historic Places in national parks